is a passenger railway station operated by the Takamatsu-Kotohira Electric Railroad in Takamatsu, Kagawa, Japan.  It is operated by the private transportation company Takamatsu-Kotohira Electric Railroad (Kotoden) and is designated station "N09".

Lines
Takata Station is a station on the Kotoden Nagao Line and is located 8.3 km from the terminus of the line at Kawaramachi Station and 10.0 kilometers from Takamatsu-Chikkō Station.

Layout
The station consists of two opposed side platforms connected by a level crossing.

Adjacent stations

History
Takata Station opened on April 30, 1912 as a station on the Takamatsu Electric Tramway. On November 1, 1943, it became a station on the Takamatsu-Kotohira Electric Railway.

Surrounding area
Kagawa University School of Medicine, Miki Campus (former Kagawa Medical University)
Kagawa Prefectural Takamatsu Higashi High School
Takamatsu City Maeda Elementary School

Passenger statistics

See also
 List of railway stations in Japan

References

External links

  

Railway stations in Japan opened in 1912
Railway stations in Takamatsu